The North Ridge of the Grand Teton is  a technical rock climbing location up the Grand Teton in Wyoming.  The route is recognized in the historic climbing text Fifty Classic Climbs of North America and considered a classic around the world.

References

External links 
rockclimbing.com
mountainproject.com

Climbing routes
Grand Teton National Park